A confederation or confederacy is a union of sovereign groups or states united for purposes of common action.

Confederation may also refer to:
 Confederation (Poland), an informal association in the Polish-Lithuanian Commonwealth
 Confederation (political party), a political party that initially formed as an alliance of right-wing political parties in Poland
 Confederacy (disambiguation), various states, communities, and other groups

See also
 Confed (disambiguation)
 Federation, a political entity characterized by a union of partially self-governing regions
 Articles of Confederation, an agreement among the 13 original United States of America that served as its first constitution
 Confederate States of America, a breakaway state that fought against the United States of America during the American Civil War